Vietnamese cuisine encompasses the foods and beverages of Vietnam. Meals feature a combination of five fundamental tastes: sweet, salty, bitter, sour, and spicy. The distinctive nature of each dish reflects one or more elements (such as nutrients and colors), which are also based around a five-pronged philosophy. Vietnamese recipes use ingredients like lemongrass, ginger, mint, Vietnamese mint, long coriander, Saigon cinnamon, bird's eye chili, lime, and Thai basil leaves. Traditional Vietnamese cooking has often been characterised as using fresh ingredients, not using much dairy or oil, having interesting textures, and making use of herbs and vegetables. The cuisine is also low in sugar and is almost always naturally gluten-free, as many of the dishes are rice-based instead of wheat-based, made with rice noodles, papers and flour. Vietnamese cuisine is strongly influenced not only by the cuisines of neighboring China, Cambodia and Laos, but also by French cuisine due to French colonial rule over the region from 1887 to 1954.  

Kikkoman, a leading soy sauce manufacturer, did market research confirming that fish sauce is the predominant table sauce in Vietnamese homes, where it captures over 70% of the market, while the share for soy sauce is under 20%.

Historical influences 

Besides indigenous Vietnamese influences, which are the major core of Vietnamese food, owing to historical contact with China and centuries of sinicization, some Vietnamese dishes share similarities with Chinese cuisine. In culinary traditions, the Chinese introduced to Vietnam several dishes, including vằn thắn/hoành thánh (wonton), xá xíu (char siu), há cảo (har gow), hủ tiếu (shahe fen), mì (wheat noodles), bò bía (popiah), bánh quẩy (youtiao), mooncake and bánh pía (Suzhou style mooncake), bánh tổ (nian gao), sủi dìn (tang yuan), bánh bò, bánh bao (baozi), cơm chiên Dương Châu (Yangzhou fried rice), and mì xào (chow mein). The Vietnamese adopted these foods and added their own styles and flavors to the foods. Ethnic minorities in the mountainous region near the China–Vietnam border also adopted some foods from China. Ethnic Tày and Nùng in Lạng Sơn Province adopted thịt lợn quay (roasted pork) and khâu nhục (braised pork belly) from China. Some New World vegetables, such as chili peppers and corn (maize), also made their way to Vietnam from the Ming dynasty.

The French introduced baguettes to Vietnam, which were combined with Vietnamese stuffing to become a popular fast food in Vietnam called bánh mì thịt, known overseas as "Vietnamese baguettes". Bánh mì is just the bread, whereas thịt implies meat or stuffing. The French also introduced Vietnam to onions, cauliflower, lettuce, potatoes, tarragon, carrot, artichoke, asparagus, and coffee.

The western-introduced ingredients often have a name derived from a similar native Vietnamese ingredient, then adding the word tây (meaning western). Onions are called hành tây (literally "western shallots"), asparagus as măng tây (western bamboo shoots) and potatoes are called khoai tây (western yam) in Vietnamese, which reflects their origin before arriving in Vietnam. French-influenced dishes are numerous and not limited to: sa lát (salad), pâté, patê sô (a Brittany pasty called "pâté chaud"), bánh sừng trâu/bánh sừng bò (croissant), bánh flan, ya ua (yogurt), rôti (rotisserie), bơ (butter), vịt nấu cam (duck à l'orange), ốp lết (omelette), ốp la (œufs au plat), phá xí (farcies), bít tết (beefsteak), sốt vang (cooking with wine), dăm bông (jambon), and xúc xích (saucisse). Owing to influences from French colonial rule, the French Indochinese countries of Laos, Vietnam, and Cambodia have several shared dishes and beverages, including baguettes and coffee. The French also introduced the use of dairy products in Vietnamese-French fusion dishes.

Vietnamese cuisine also has influences from Champa, Malaysia and Cambodia. The use of coconut milk and various central dishes such as bánh khọt were influenced by Cham cuisine. Spices including curries were also introduced to Vietnam by Malay and Indian traders. Though not common in the north, cà ri is a quite popular dish in central and southern Vietnam. The most common form is chicken curry, and to a lesser extent, goat curry. Chicken curry is an indispensable dish in many social gathering events, such as weddings, funerals, graduations, and the yearly death anniversary of a loved one. Similar to Cambodia, curry in Vietnam is eaten either with bread, steamed rice, or round rice noodles (rice vermicelli). Mắm bồ hóc or prahok, adopted from ethnic Khmer in Southern Vietnam, is used as a central ingredient of a Vietnamese rice noodle soup called bún nước lèo which originated with ethnic Khmers in Vietnam and is not found in Cambodia.

Owing to contact with previous communist countries from Eastern Europe, the Vietnamese adopted dishes such as stuffed cabbage soup, sa lát Nga (Olivier salad) and bia Tiệp (Czech beer).

Regional cuisines 

The mainstream culinary traditions in all three regions of Vietnam share some fundamental features:
 Freshness of food: Most meats are only briefly cooked. Vegetables are eaten fresh; if they are cooked, they are boiled or only briefly stir-fried.
 Presence of herbs and vegetables: Herbs and vegetables are essential to many Vietnamese dishes and are often abundantly used.
 Variety and harmony of textures: Crisp with soft, watery with crunchy, delicate with rough.
 Broths or soup-based dishes are common in all three regions.
 Presentation: The condiments accompanying Vietnamese meals are usually colorful and arranged in eye-pleasing manners.

While sharing some key features, Vietnamese culinary tradition differs from region to region.

In northern Vietnam, a colder climate limits the production and availability of spices. As a result, the foods there are often less spicy than those in other regions. Black pepper is used in place of chilies as the most popular ingredient to produce spicy flavors. In general, northern Vietnamese cuisine is not bold in any particular taste—sweet, salty, spicy, bitter, or sour. Most northern Vietnamese foods feature light and balanced flavors that result from subtle combinations of many different flavoring ingredients. The use of meats such as pork, beef, and chicken were relatively limited in the past. Freshwater fish, crustaceans, and mollusks, such as prawns, squids, shrimps, crabs, clams, and mussels, are widely used. Many notable dishes of northern Vietnam are crab-centered (e.g., bún riêu). Fish sauce, soy sauce, prawn sauce, and limes are among the main flavoring ingredients. Being the cradle of Vietnamese civilization, northern Vietnam produces many signature dishes of Vietnam, such as bún riêu and bánh cuốn, which were carried to central and southern Vietnam through Vietnamese migration. Other famous Vietnamese dishes that originated from the north, particularly from Hanoi include "bún chả" (rice noodle with grilled marinated pork), phở gà (chicken soup with rice noodles), chả cá Lã Vọng (rice noodle with grilled fish).

The abundance of spices produced by Central Vietnam's mountainous terrain makes this region's cuisine notable for its spicy food, which sets it apart from the two other regions of Vietnam, where foods are mostly not spicy. Once the capital of the last dynasty of Vietnam, Huế's culinary tradition features highly decorative and colorful food, reflecting the influence of ancient Vietnamese royal cuisine. The region's cuisine is also notable for its sophisticated meals consisting of many complex dishes served in small portions. Chili peppers and shrimp sauces are among the frequently used ingredients. Some Vietnamese signature dishes produced in central Vietnam are bún bò Huế and bánh khoái.

The warm weather and fertile soil of southern Vietnam create an ideal condition for growing a wide variety of fruits, vegetables, and livestock. As a result, foods in southern Vietnam are often vibrant and flavorful, with liberal uses of garlic, shallots, and fresh herbs. Sugar is added to food more than in the other regions. The preference for sweetness in southern Vietnam can also be seen through the widespread use of coconut milk in southern Vietnamese cuisine. Vast shorelines make seafood a natural staple for people in this region. Some signature seafood dishes from southern Vietnam include bánh khọt and bún mắm.

The Mekong Delta cuisine relies heavily on fresh products which is abundant in the new land with heavy use of palm sugar, fermented fishes, seafoods and wild herbs and flowers. The history of the region being a newly settled area reflects on its cuisine, with Ẩm thực khẩn hoang or Settlers cuisine means dishes are prepared fresh from wild and newly-caught ingredients. The cuisine is also influenced by Khmer, Cham and Chinese settlers.

The cuisine of the Northern and Central Highlands regions is influenced by tribal traditions, with items such as thắng cố (Hmong horse stew), dried meats, cơm lam and rượu cần.

Relation to Vietnamese philosophy 
Vietnamese cuisine always has five elements which are known for its balance in each of these features.

 Many Vietnamese dishes include five fundamental taste senses: spicy (metal), sour (wood), bitter (fire), salty (water) and sweet (earth), corresponding to five organs: gall bladder, small intestine, large intestine, stomach, and urinary bladder.
 Vietnamese dishes also include five types of nutrients: powder, water or liquid, mineral elements, protein, and fat.
 Vietnamese cooks try to have five colours: white (metal), green (wood), yellow (earth), red (fire) and black (water) in their dishes.
 Dishes in Vietnam appeal to gastronomes via the five senses: food arrangement attracts eyes, sounds come from crisp ingredients, five spices are detected on the tongue, aromatic ingredients coming mainly from herbs stimulate the nose, and some meals, especially finger food, can be perceived by touching.

Five-element correspondence 

Vietnamese cuisine is influenced by the Asian principle of five elements and Mahābhūta.

Yin-yang balance 
The principle of yin and yang is applied in composing a meal in a way that provides a balance that is beneficial for the body. While contrasting texture and flavors are important, the principle primarily concerns the "heating" and "cooling" properties of ingredients. Certain dishes are served in their respective seasons to provide contrasts in temperature and spiciness of the food and environment. Some examples are:
 Duck meat, considered "cool", is served during the hot summer with ginger fish sauce, which is "warm". Conversely, chicken, which is "warm", and pork, which is "hot", are eaten in the winter.
 Seafoods ranging from "cool" to "cold" are suitable to use with ginger ("warm").
 Spicy foods ("hot") are typically balanced with sourness, which is considered "cool".
 Balut, meaning "upside-down egg" ("cold"), must be combined with Vietnamese mint ("hot").

Food in relation to lifestyle 

Vietnamese cuisine is reflective of the Vietnamese lifestyle, from the preparation to how the food is served. Going through long phases of war and political conflict, as well as cultural shifts, the vast majority of the Vietnamese people have been living in poverty. Therefore, the ingredients for Vietnamese food are often very inexpensive but nonetheless, the way they are cooked together to create a yin–yang balance makes the food simple in appearance but rich in flavor.

Because of economic conditions, maximizing the use of ingredients to save money has become a tradition in Vietnamese cooking. In earlier decades and even nowadays in rural areas, every part of a cow is used, from the muscle meat to the intestines; nothing is wasted. The higher quality cuts from farmed animals (cows, pigs) would be cooked in stirfry, soup or other dishes, while the secondary cuts would be used in blood sausages or soup. The same goes for vegetables like scallions: the leafy part is diced into small bits which are used to add flavor to the food while the crunchy stalk and roots are replanted.

 (fish sauce) is the most commonly used and iconic condiment in Vietnamese cooking. It is made from fermented raw fish and is served with most of the Vietnamese dishes. Vietnamese cuisines are not known for ingredients with top quality, but rather for the very inexpensive and simple scraps that are creatively mixed to create dishes with bold flavor. A traditional southern Vietnamese meal usually includes  (plain white rice),  (catfish in a clay pot),  (sour soup with snakehead fish), and it would be incomplete without fish sauce served as a condiment. Dishes are prepared less with an appearance in mind but are served family-style to bring everyone together after a long day of work.

Despite being a small country in Southeast Asia, the foods from each region in Vietnam carry their distinctive and unique characteristics that reflect the geographical and living conditions of the people there. The southern-style diet is very 'green', with vegetables, fish and tropical fruits as the main ingredients.

Central Vietnam is the region in which food is prepared with the strongest, boldest flavors. This region is constantly under harsh weather conditions throughout the year, so people there do not have as many green ingredients as others do in the north and south of Vietnam. Instead, the coastline around the central Vietnam area is known for its salt and fish sauce industries; these two condiments are central to their daily diets.

While rice is a staple in the southern Vietnamese diet, the north has a preference for noodles. Owing to the drastic differences in climate and lifestyles throughout the three main regions of Vietnam, the foods vary. Northern Vietnamese cooking is the least bold and spicy in flavor compared to the foods from central and southern Vietnam.

Typical Vietnamese family meal 

Daily meals of Vietnamese people are quite different from Vietnamese foods served in restaurants or stalls. A typical meal for the average Vietnamese family would include:
 Cơm trắng: Cooked white rice
 Món mặn or main dishes to eat with rice: Fish/seafood, meat, tofu (grilled, boiled, steamed, stewed or stir-fried with vegetables)
 Rau: Sauteed, boiled or raw fresh green vegetables
 Canh (a clear broth with vegetables and often meat or seafood) or other kinds of soup
 Nước chấm: Dipping sauces and condiments depending on the main dishes, such as pure fish sauce, ginger fish sauce, tamarind fish sauce, soy sauce, muối tiêu chanh (salt and pepper with lime juice) or muối ớt (salt and chili)
 Small dish of relishes, such as salted eggplant, pickled white cabbage, pickled papaya, pickled garlic or pickled bean sprouts
 Tráng miệng or desserts: Fresh fruits, drinks or sweets, such as chè.

Except individual bowls of rice, all dishes are communal and are to be shared in the middle of the table. It is also customary for younger people to ask/wait for the elders to eat first and for the woman who sits directly next to the rice pot to serve rice for other people. People should "invite" the others to enjoy the meal (somehow similar to saying "Enjoy your meal"), in order from the elders to younger people. They also pick up food for each other as an action of care.

Feast 

A feast is a significant event for families or villages, usually up to 12 people for each table. A feast is prepared for weddings, funerals, and festivals, including the longevity-wishing ceremony. In a feast, ordinary foods are not served, but boiled rice is still used.

A Vietnamese feast has two courses: the main course (—salty dish) and dessert (—sweet dish). All dishes, except for individual bowls of rice, are enjoyed collectively. All main course dishes are served simultaneously rather than one after another. The major dish of the main course is placed in the center of the tables, usually big pots of soup or a hot pot.

This kind of feast is traditional and is organized only in northern Vietnam. Other variations are found in central and southern Vietnam.

At this time, the feast for offering ancestors includes sticky rice, boiled chicken, Vietnamese rice wine, and other foods preferred by ancestors. Gifts are given before guests leave the feast.

Royal cuisine 

In the Nguyễn dynasty, the 50 best chefs from all over the kingdom were selected for the  board to serve the king. There were three meals per day—12 dishes at breakfast and 66 dishes for lunch and dinner (including 50 main dishes and 16 sweets). An essential dish was bird's nest soup. Other dishes included shark fin, abalone, deer's tendon, bears' hands, and rhinoceros' skin. Water had to come from the  well, the  pagoda, the  well (near the base of  mountain), or from the source of the  River. Rice was the  variety from the  imperial rice field.  clay pots for cooking rice were used only a single time before disposal. No one was allowed to have any contact with the cooked dishes except for the cooks and  board members. The dishes were first served to eunuchs, then the king's wives, after which they were offered to the king. The king enjoyed meals alone in a comfortable, music-filled space.

Cultural importance 
Salt is used as the connection between the worlds of the living and the dead. Bánh phu thê is used to remind new couples of perfection and harmony at their weddings. Food is often placed at the ancestral altar as an offering to the dead on special occasions (such as Lunar New Year). Cooking and eating play an extremely important role in Vietnamese culture.

Proverbs 
The word ăn (to eat) is included in a great number of proverbs and has a large range of semantic extensions.
  ("Checking the status of the rice pot when eating, watch where/what direction you are sitting.") = Be careful of possible faux pas.
  = living in accordance to one's limit and social circumstance
  ("The father eats salty food, the children go thirsty.") = Bad actions will later bring bad luck/consequences to descendants.
  ("Chewing carefully [makes one] feel full longer, ploughing deep is good for the rice") = Careful execution brings better results than hasty actions.
  ("Learning how to eat, how to speak, how to wrap, how to open") = Everything needs to be learned, even the simplest, start from "how to eat" politely.

Many Vietnamese idioms reflect the sex-is-eating mapping:
  ("He eats meatballs, she eats springrolls") = Both husband and wife are having affairs.
  ("Tired of rice, craving noodle soup") = A man gets bored of his wife and find another girl.
  ("You eat snack, you pay money") = Pay before having sex with prostitutes. (Long story short, bánh is a metaphor for the prostitute)
  ("Eating on the sly without cleaning your mouth") = Committing adultery but left trace

International popularity 
Outside of Vietnam, Vietnamese cuisine is widely available in countries with strong Vietnamese immigrant communities, such as Australia, the United States, Canada, and France. Vietnamese cuisine is also popular in Japan, Korea, the Czech Republic, Slovakia, Germany, United Kingdom, Poland, Philippines and Russia, and in areas with dense Asian populations.

Television shows featuring Vietnamese food have increased in popularity. Luke Nguyen from Australia currently features a television show, Luke Nguyen's Vietnam, dedicated on showcasing and instructing how to cook Vietnamese dishes.

On The Great Food Truck Race, a Vietnamese sandwich truck called Nom Nom Truck received the most money in the first five episodes.

Anthony Bourdain wrote: You don't have to go looking for great food in Vietnam. Great food finds you. It's everywhere. In restaurants, cafes, little storefronts, in the streets; carried in makeshift portable kitchens on yokes borne by women vendors. Your cyclo-driver will invite you to his home; your guide will want to bring you to his favorite place. Strangers will rush up and offer you a taste of something they're proud of and think you should know about. It's a country filled with proud cooks—and passionate eaters.

Gordon Ramsay visited Vietnam in his reality show Gordon's Great Escape - S02E02 (2011) and fell in love with the taste of the culinary here. Especially the dish called Hủ tiếu Mì by Mrs. Dì Hai, prepped and served on a small boat in Cái Răng floating market, Cần Thơ. He even praised it as "The greatest dish I have ever eaten" when he brought it up as one of the dishes for the elimination challenge for the top 5 finalists of American MasterChef season 4 episode 21.

Cooking techniques 

Some common Vietnamese culinary terms include:
 Rán, chiên – fried dishes
 Chiên nước mắm – fried then tossed with fish sauce
 Chiên bột – battered then deep-fried
 Rang – dry-fried dishes with little to no oil
 Áp chảo – pan-fried then sautéed
 Xào – stir fry, sautéing
 Xào tỏi – stir fry with garlic, very common way of cooking vegetables
 Xào sả ớt – sautéed with lemongrass and chili pepper
 Xào lăn – pan searing or stir frying quickly to cook raw meat
 Xáo măng – braised or sautéed with bamboo shoots
 Nhồi thịt – stuffed with minced meat before cooking
 Sốt chua ngọt – fried with sweet and sour sauce
 Kho – stew, braised dishes
 Kho khô – literally dried stew (until the sauce thickens)
 Kho tiêu/kho gừng/kho riềng – stewed with peppercorns/ginger/galangal
 Nấu – means cooking, usually in a pot
 Nấu nước dừa – cooked with coconut water
 Hầm/ninh – slow-cook with spices or other ingredients
 Canh – broth-like soup to be served over rice
 Rim – simmering
 Luộc – boiling with water, usually fresh vegetables and meat
 Chần – blanche
 Hấp – steamed dishes
 Hấp sả – steamed with lemongrass
 Hấp Hồng Kông or hấp xì dầu – "Hong Kong-style" steamed dish (i.e.: with scallion, ginger and soy sauce)
 Om – clay pot cooking of northern style
 Om sữa – cooked in clay pot with milk
 Om chuối đậu – cooked with young banana and tofu
 Gỏi – salad dishes, usually with meat, fish
 Gói lá – wrap raw ingredients by a leaf (often banana) to form shape and enhance fragant
 Nộm – salads, usually meatless
 Nướng – grilled dishes
 Nướng xiên – skewered dishes
 Nướng ống tre – cooked in bamboo tubes over fire
 Nướng mọi/nướng trui/thui – char-grilled over open fire
 Nướng đất sét/lá chuối – cooked in a clay mould or banana leaves wrap, or recently, kitchen foil, hence the method has evolved into nướng giấy bạc
 Nướng muối ớt – marinated with salt and chili pepper before being grilled
 Nướng tỏi – marinated with garlic then grilled
 Nướng mỡ hành – grilled then topped with melted lard, peanuts, and chopped green onions
 Bằm – sauteed mix of chopped ingredients
 Cháo – congee dishes
 Súp – soup dishes (not canh or clear broth soup)
 Rô ti – roasting then simmering meat, usually with strong spices
 Tráng – spreading ingredient into a thin layer on a steamed/hot surface
 Cà ri – curry or curry-like dishes
 Quay – roasted dishes
 Lẩu – hot pot dishes
 Nhúng dấm – cooked in a vinegar-based hot pot, some variations include vinegar and coconut water-based hot pot
 Cuốn – any dish featuring rice paper wraps with bún and fresh herbs
 Bóp thấu/tái chanh – raw meat or seafood prepared with lime or vinegar

Vietnamese utensils

Common ingredients

Vegetables

Fruits

Herbs (rau thơm)

Condiments and sauces

Condiments 

Vietnamese usually use raw vegetables, rau sống, or rau ghém (sliced vegetable) as condiments for their dishes to combine properly with each main dish in flavour. Dishes in which rau sống is indispensable are bánh xèo and hot pot. The vegetables principally are herbs and wild edible vegetables gathered from forests and family gardens. Leaves and buds are the most common parts of vegetables used. Most of the vegetables have medicinal value.

Rau sống includes lettuce, raw bean sprout, herbs, shredded banana flower, green banana, water spinach, mango bud and guava leaves.

Herbs and spices 

 Coriander and green onion leaves can be found in most Vietnamese dishes.
 A basic technique of stir-frying vegetable is frying garlic or shallot with oil before putting the vegetable into the pan.
 In northern Vietnam, dishes with fish may be garnished with dill.
 In central Vietnam, the mixture of ground lemongrass and chili pepper is frequently used in dishes with beef.
 In southern Vietnam, coconut water is used in most stew dishes.
 The pair culantro (ngò gai) and rice paddy herb (ngò om or ngổ) is indispensable in all kinds of sour soups in the southern Vietnam.
 Spearmint is often used with strongly fishy dishes.
 Perilla is usually used with crab dishes.

Pairing 
 Chicken dishes are combined with lime leaves.
 Crab and seashell dishes are combined with fishy-smelling herb and perilla.
 Dishes reputed as "cold" or "fishy-smelling", such as catfish, clams, or snails, are combined with ginger or lemongrass.
 Beef dishes are combined with celeries or pineapples.

Sauces 
 Nước chấm
 Mắm tôm (shrimp paste)
 Nước mắm (fish extract) can be used as it is or mixed with lemon juice, garlic, vinegar, sugar, and chili. This mixture is called nước mắm pha.
 Tương is made from fermented soybeans.
 Soy sauce mostly is used in marinades and sauces.
 Hoisin sauce is used in Southern Vietnam to mix with phở while serving.
 Hot chili sauce.

Food colourings 

Traditionally, the colouring of Vietnamese food comes from natural ingredients, however today there's an increase in the use of artificial food dye agents for food colouring, in Vietnam.
 Red – usually from beetroot or by frying annatto seeds to make oil (dầu điều)
 Orange – usually used for sticky rice, comes from gac
 Yellow – from turmeric
 Green – from the pandan leaf or katuk
 Purple – from the magenta plant (lá cẩm)
 Black – in banh gai is from the ramie leaf (lá gai)
 Dark brown – for stew dishes, uses nước màu or nước hàng, which is made by heating sugar to a temperature above that of caramel (170 °C).

Colourings can be absorbed by mixing ground colourings or colouring liquid or wrapping before boiling to get the extracts. When colouring dishes, the tastes and smells of colourings must also be considered.

Popular dishes 

When Vietnamese dishes are referred to in English, it is generally by the Vietnamese name without the diacritics. Some dishes have gained descriptive English names, as well.

Popular Vietnamese dishes include:

Noodle soups 

Vietnamese cuisine boasts a huge variety of noodle soups, each with distinct influences, origins and flavours. A common characteristic of many of these soups is a rich broth.

Soup and cháo (congees)

Rice dishes

Sticky rice dishes

Bánh 

The Vietnamese name for pastries is bánh. Many of the pastries are wrapped in various leaves (bamboo, banana, dong, gai) and boiled or steamed. One of the historic dishes, dating to the mythical founding of the Vietnamese state is bánh chưng. As it is a savory dish and thus not a true pastry, bánh chưng and the accompanying bánh dày are laden with heaven and earth symbolism. These dishes are associated with offerings around the Vietnamese New Year (Tết). Additionally, as a legacy of French colonial rule and influence, bûche de Noël is a popular dessert served during the Christmas season.

Wraps and rolls 

Bánh tráng can be understood as either of the following:
 Bánh tráng cuốn
 Thin rice flour sheet dried into what is commonly called "rice paper", used in making spring roll (chả giò), and summer rolls (gỏi cuốn) by applying some water to soften the texture
 Bánh tráng nướng (in the south), or bánh đa in the north
 These are large, round, flat rice crackers, which, when heated, enlarge into round, easily shattered pieces. They can be eaten separately, although they are most commonly added into the vermicelli noodle dishes like cao lầu and mì quảng. Many types of bánh tráng exist, including the clear sesame seed ones, prawn-like cracker with dried spring onions, and sweet milk.

Sandwiches and pastries

Meat dishes

Seafood dishes

Salads 

Nộm (Northern dialects) or Gỏi (Southern dialects) is Vietnamese salad; of the many varieties, the most popular include:

Curries 
 Vietnamese curry is also popular, especially in the center and south, owing to the cultural influence of Indian, Khmer and Malay traders.
 Another type of well-known Vietnamese curry is beef brisket curry or oxtail curry. The beef curries are often served with French bread for dipping, or with rice.
  Cà ri gà is a popular Vietnamese curry made with chicken, carrots, sweet potatoes, and peas in a coconut curry sauce. It is also served with rice or baguette.

Preserved dishes 
Muối (literally means salting) and chua (literally means sour or fermenting) are Vietnamese term for preserved dishes. Monsoon tropical climate with abundant rainfall gives the Vietnamese a generous year-round supply of vegetables. Animal husbandry never occurred in large scale in Vietnamese history, therefore, preserved dishes are mainly plant-based pickled dishes. Seafood is often made into a fermented form called mắm like fish sauce.

Mắm 
Mắm is a Vietnamese term for fermented fish, shrimp or other aquatic ingredients. It is used as main course, as an ingredient or as condiment. The types of fish most commonly used to make mắm are anchovies, catfish, snakeheads, and mackerels. The fish flesh remains intact (this is how it is different from nước mắm), and can be eaten cooked or uncooked, with or without vegetables and condiments. Fish sauce is literally called "mắm water" in Vietnamese and is the distilled liquid from the process of fermentation of mắm.

Fermented meat dishes 

Nem chua, a Vietnamese fermented meat served as is or fried, is made from pork meat, coated by fried rice (thính gạo), mixed with pork skin and then wrapped in country gooseberry leaves (lá chùm ruột) or Erythrina orientalis leaves (lá vông nem). The preservation process takes about three to five days.

Sausages 

Vietnamese sausage, giò, is usually made from fresh ground pork and beef. Sausage makers may use the meat, skin or ear. Fish sauce is added before banana leaves are used to wrap the mixture. The last step is boiling. For common sausage, 1 kg of meat is boiled for an hour. For chả quế, the boiled meat mixture will then be roasted with cinnamon.

Vegetarian dishes 

Vegetarian dishes in Vietnam often have the same names as their meat equivalents, e.g. phở bò, but with chay (vegetarian) sign in front, those dishes are served with tofu instead of meat. Nearly every soup, sandwich and street food has its vegetarian correspondent. Sometimes you can also see notations like "phở chay", "bánh mì chay" (vegetarian sandwich) or "cơm chay" (vegetarian rice). Vegetarian food in comparison the normal dishes are almost always cheaper, often half of the normal price. Vegetarian restaurants are mostly frequented by religious Vietnamese people and are rarely found in touristic areas. Vegetarian food is also eaten to earn luck during special holiday and festival, especially during Lunar New Year where Vietnamese culture serve vegetarian food regardless of their religion.

Desserts

Mứt 

Vietnamese use fruits in season. When the season is passing, they make candied fruit, called ô mai, and fruit preserves, called mứt. The original taste of ô mai is sour, sweet, salty, and spicy. The most famous kind of ô mai is ô mai mơ, made from apricots harvested from the forest around Perfume Pagoda (Chùa Hương), Hà Tây Province. This ô mai consists of apricot covered by ginger, sugar, and liquorice root slivers.

Tofu 

Tofu (đậu phụ) is widely used in Vietnamese cuisine. It is boiled, fried (sprinkled with ground shrimp or oil-dipped minced spring onion) or used as an ingredient in a variety of dishes.

Other soybean products range from soy sauce (nước tương; usually light soy sauce), fermented bean paste (tương), and fermented bean curd (đậu phụ nhự or chao) to douhua (soft tofu sweet soup; tàu hũ nước đường or tào phớ).

Exotic dishes 

The use of ingredients typically uncommon or taboo in most countries is one of the quintessential attributes that make Vietnamese cuisine unique. While unusual ingredients can only be found in exotic restaurants in many countries, Vietnamese cuisine is deemed atypical in that the usage of these ingredients can play a customary role in daily family dishes regardless of social class.

A common and inexpensive breakfast dish that can be found in any wet market, balut (hột vịt lộn) is a fertilized duck egg with a nearly developed embryo inside, which is boiled and eaten in the shell. It is typically served with fresh herbs: rau răm, salt, and black pepper; lime juice is another popular additive, when available. A more unusual version of balut dish—fetus quail (trứng cút lộn) is a snack favored by many Vietnamese students. Paddy crab and paddy snail are the main ingredients in bún riêu ốc—a popular noodle dish—and in some everyday soup dishes (canh) and braised food (món bung). Family meals with silkworms (nhộng), banana flowers (hoa chuối), sparrows, doves, fermented fish and shrimp (mắm cá, mắm tôm, mắm tép) are not rare sights. Seasonal favorites include ragworms (rươi), which are made into many dishes such as fried rươi omelet (chả rươi), fermented rươi sauce (mắm rươi), steamed rươi (rươi hấp), stir-fried rươi with radish or bamboo shoot (rươi xào củ niễng măng tươi hay củ cải). Three striped crab (ba khía) is popular in several southern provinces, including Cà Mau, Sóc Trăng and Bạc Liêu; it is eaten fermented, stir-fried or steamed.

Northern Vietnamese cuisine is also notable for its wide range of meat choices. Exotic meats such as dog meat, cat meat, rat meat, snake, soft-shell turtle, deer, and domestic goat are sold in street-side restaurants and generally paired with alcoholic beverages. A taboo in many Western countries and in southern Vietnam, consumption of dog meat and cat meat is common throughout the northern part of the country and is believed to raise the libido in men. Television chef Andrew Zimmern visited northern Vietnam in the 12th episode of his popular show Bizarre Foods with Andrew Zimmern. Cobra beating heart and dried bones, silkworms, and bull penis are some of the dishes he sampled. He also tried porcupine.

Paddy mouse meat—barbecued, braised, stir- or deep-fried—is a delicacy dish that can be found in Southern Vietnamese rural areas or even high-end city restaurants.

Crocodiles were eaten by Vietnamese while they were taboo and off limits for Chinese.

Shark fins are imported in massive amounts by Vietnam.

Anthony Bourdain, the host chef of Travel Channel's Anthony Bourdain: No Reservations, wrote in April 2005: "...everything is used—and nothing wasted in Vietnam." Animal parts that are often disposed of in many Western countries are used fully in Vietnamese cooking. Organs, including lungs, livers, hearts, intestines and bladders of pigs, cattle, and chickens are sold at even higher prices than their meat. Chicken testicles and undeveloped eggs are stir-fried with vegetables and served as an everyday dish.

Pig and beef tails, as well as chicken heads, necks and feet, are Vietnamese favorite beer dishes. Bóng bì, used as an ingredient in canh bóng—a kind of soup, is pig skin baked until popped. Steamed pig brains can be found almost everywhere. Also in the northern part of Vietnam, different kinds of animal blood can be made into a dish called tiết canh by whisking the blood with fish sauce and cold water in a shallow dish along with finely chopped, cooked duck innards (such as gizzards), sprinkled with crushed peanuts and chopped herbs such as Vietnamese coriander, mint, etc. It is then cooled until the blood coagulates into a soft, jelly-like mixture and served raw.

Coconut worms, or đuông dừa, is a delicacy found widely in the Trà Vinh Province of Vietnam. They are the larvae form of the palm weevil and are eaten live within a salty fish sauce with chili peppers.

Beverages

See also 

 List of Vietnamese dishes
 List of Vietnamese culinary specialities
 List of Vietnamese ingredients
 Vietnamese noodles
 Vietnamese wine
 Rượu đế rice wine
 Basa (fish)
 Southeast Asian cuisine

References

Further reading 

 Nguyen, Andrea Quynhgiao; Cost, Bruce (FRW); Beisch, Leigh. (2006) Into the Vietnamese kitchen: treasured foodways, modern flavors. Ten Speed Press, 
 Le, Ann; Fay, Julie. (2006) The Little Saigon Cookbook: Vietnamese Cuisine and Culture in Southern California's Little Saigon, Globe Pequot, 
 Thị Chơi Triệu, Marcel Isaak, (1998) The Food of Vietnam: Authentic Recipes from the Heart of Indochina, Tuttle Publishing, 
 recette de cuisine vietnamienne
 McDermott, Nancie; Alpert, Caren (2005) Quick & Easy Vietnamese: 75 Everyday Recipes Chronicle Books, 
 Chi Nguyen; Judy Monroe, (2002) Cooking the Vietnamese way: revised and expanded to include new low-fat and vegetarian recipes Twenty-First Century Books, 
 Pauline Nguyen; Luke Nguyen; Mark Jensen (2007), Secrets of the Red Lantern: Stories and Vietnamese Recipes from the Heart Murdoch Books, 
 Thị Chơi Triệu, Marcel Isaak, Heinz Von Holzen (2005), Authentic Recipes from Vietnam Tuttle Publishing, 
 Hoyer, Daniel. (2009) Culinary Vietnam. Gibbs Smith, 

 
 
Southeast Asian cuisine
Articles containing video clips